The Estates General of 1789  was a general assembly representing the French estates of the realm: the clergy (First Estate), the nobility (Second Estate), and the commoners (Third Estate). It was the last of the Estates General of the Kingdom of France. Summoned by King Louis XVI, the Estates General of 1789 ended when the Third Estate formed the National Assembly and, against the wishes of the King, invited the other two estates to join. This signaled the outbreak of the French Revolution.

The decision to summon the Estates

First Assembly of Notables and peasants 
The suggestion to summon the Estates General came from the Assembly of Notables installed by the King on 22 February 1787. This institution had not been called since 1614. In 1787, the Parlement of Paris was refusing to ratify Charles Alexandre de Calonne's program of badly needed financial reform, due to the special interests of its noble members. Calonne was the Controller-General of Finances, appointed by the King to address the state deficit. As a last measure, Calonne was hoping to bypass them by reviving the archaic institution. The initial roster of Notables included 137 nobles, among them many future revolutionaries, such as the Comte de Mirabeau and the Marquis de Lafayette, known at this time for his central role in the American Revolution. Calonne received little cooperation from the assembly, being dismissed on 8 April 1787 and banished shortly after for proposing a 'Subvention Territoriale', or land tax. He continued to comment on the French political scene from London.

Étienne Charles de Loménie de Brienne, President of the Assembly of Notables, succeeded Calonne as the Controller-General of Finances. He was offered the post of Prime Minister by the king, which was to include being Controller. The Notables nevertheless remained recalcitrant. They made a number of proposals but they would not grant the King money. Lafayette suggested that the problem required a national assembly. Brienne asked him if he meant the Estates General. On receiving an affirmative answer, Brienne recorded it as a proposal. Frustrated by his inability to obtain money, the King staged a day-long harangue, and then on 25 May dissolved the Notables. Their proposals reverted to the Parlement.

Rebellion of the Parlements 
Turning again to the parlements, the king found that they were inclined to continue the issues that had been raised in the Assembly of Notables. Their proper legal function, besides giving advice to the king, was only to register, or record, his edicts as law, a matter of simple obedience, which the king's antecessors had been able to command, sometimes by sternness, threats, and losses of temper. Unless registered, the edicts were not lawful.

On 6 July 1787, Loménie forwarded the Subvention Territoriale and another tax, the Edit du Timbre, or "Stamp Act," based on the American model, for registration. The parlement refused to register an illegal act, demanding accounting statements, or "States," as a prior condition. It was the king's turn to refuse. The members of the parlement insisted that they required either the accounting States or a meeting of the Estates General. The king would not let this slight to his authority pass and commanded the parliament to assemble at Versailles, where on 6 August he ordered them in person  to register the taxes. On 7 August back in Paris, parlement declared in earnest this time the order to be null and void, repudiating all previous registrations of taxes. Only the Estates General, they said, could register taxes.

For the second time, the king summoned the parlement away from Paris, where crowds of people cheered their every action from the street, this time to meet at Troyes, Champagne on 15 August. He did not personally appear. By messenger he and the parlement negotiated an agreement: the king withdrew the Stamp Tax and modified the Land Tax to exclude the lands of people of title in return for the assured registration of further loans. The parlement was allowed to return on 20 September. Encouraged, Loménie, with the support of the king, went beyond what was agreed to by parlement—the granting of specific loans. He proposed an Emprunt Successif (Successive Loan) until 1792 giving the king a blank cheque. When parlement delayed, the king resorted to a ruse; he scheduled a Royal Hunt for 19 November. On that day at 11:00 AM the king and his peers noisily entered the session of parlement dressed in hunting clothes. They would confer with each other and have the decisions registered immediately, they said.

Nearly the entire government was now face-to-face. They argued the problems and issues concerned until dusk, some six hours later. Parlement believed that the problem had gone beyond the government and needed the decisions of the Estates General which did not correspond to the king's concept of monarchy. At the end of the day, the king demanded the registration of the Successive Loan. The Duc d'Orléans (a previous Notable, a relative of the king, and an ardent revolutionary), later known as Philippe Égalité, asked if this were a Royal Session of the Peers or a Session of Parlement. On being told it was a Royal Session he replied that edicts were not registered at Royal Sessions. The king retorted, Vous êtes bien le maître (do as YOU will) with some sarcasm as the king's will was legally required, and strode angrily from the session with a retinue. Lettres de Cachet, or arbitrary arrest warrants, followed on the 20th for D'Orleans and two others. They were taken into custody and held under comfortable conditions away from Paris; D'Orleans on his country estate. Parlement began a debate on the legality of Lettres de Cachet. The men being held became a cause célèbre.

As the king and parlement could accomplish no more together, Brienne, over the winter, pressed for an alternative plan; to resurrect even more archaic institutions. The Grand Bailliages, or larger legal jurisdictions that once had existed, would assume parlements' legal functions, while the Plenary Court, last known under Louis IX, when it had the power to register edicts, would assume the registration duties of the parlements, leaving them with no duties to perform. The king planned a sudden revelation and dismissal of parlement. However, Jean-Jacques Duval d'Eprémesnil heard the government presses running and bribed the printer to give him the proofs of the edict. Hearing it read the next day, 3 May 1788, parlement swore an oath not to be disbanded and defined a manifesto of their rights.

Warrants were issued for d'Eprémesnil and another but they escaped from their homes over the rooftops in the early morning to seek refuge in parlement. The king sent his guards to arrest them, and they surrendered. Parlement filed silently out between a line of guards. The commander gave the key to the building to the king.

The Jacobins 
The transfer of power to the new government was to begin on 8 May 1788 with the registration of the edicts establishing it in the regional Parlement. The latter refused unanimously following the Parlement of Paris. If the King's commissioners forced the issue Parlement abandoned the meeting place only to return the next day to declare the registration null and void. Armed protest swept the kingdom. Street fighting broke out at Rennes, Brittany. A deputation sent to Paris from there was imprisoned in the Bastille. The Bretons in Paris founded the Breton Club, later renamed the Jacobin Society. The Grand Bailliages could not be created and the Plenary Court met only once.

Convening the Estates-General

Edict of 24 January 1789 

The Estates-General were summoned by a royal edict dated to 24 January 1789. It comprised two parts: a Lettre du Roi, and a Règlement.

The Lettre announces:
"We have need of a concourse of our faithful subjects, to assist us surmount all the difficulties we find relative to the state of our finances... These great motives have resolved us to convoke the assemblée des États of all the provinces under our authority ...."

The King promises to address the grievances of his people. The "most notable persons" of each community and judicial district are summoned "to confer and to record remonstrances, complaints, and grievances." Elections for Deputies are to be held. He says that he intends "reform of abuse," "establishment of a fixed and durable order," and "general prosperity." The Lettre is signed "Louis."

Lettres de Convocation were sent to all the provinces with the Règlement prescribing the methods of election. During the preceding autumn the Parlement of Paris, an aristocratic advisory body to the King, had decided that the organization of the convention would be the same as in 1614, the last time the Estates had met. As 175 years had gone by since then it is clear the Estates were not a functional institution in French society. By reviving them as much as possible like they had been the King and the Parlement intended to control the authority of the people. The previous Estates had voted by order; that is, the Nobles and the Clergy could together outvote the Commons by 2 to 1.

If on the other hand, each delegate were to have one vote, the majority would prevail. The issue was widely discussed in the press during the autumn of 1788. The people would nonetheless accept any national convention confident that enough members of the Nobility and the Clergy would be with them to sway the votes. A National Party was formed. It argued that France had never had a constitution and the proper function of the convention was to establish one. The royalist defenders, however, accepted the absolute monarchy as the constitution. Just to be certain the press began to demand that the Commons be allocated twice as many delegates as each of the other two Estates. In an attempt to bolster his failing popularity the King acceded to this measure of "doubling the Third." He was confident of his influence over the Nobility and Clergy.

Elections of early spring 1789 
The First Estate represented 100,000 Catholic clergy; the Church owned about 10 percent of the land and collected its own taxes (the tithe) from peasants. The lands were controlled by bishops and abbots of monasteries, but two-thirds of the 303 delegates from the First Estate were ordinary parish priests; only 51 were bishops. The Second Estate represented the
nobility, about 400,000 men and women who owned about 25 percent of the land and collected seigneurial dues and rents from their peasant tenants. About a third of the 282 deputies representing the Second Estate were landed, mostly with minor holdings. The Third Estate representation was doubled to 578 men, representing about 98 percent of the population of roughly 28 million. Half were well-educated lawyers or local officials. Nearly a third were in trades or industry; 51 were wealthy land owners.

The Règlement that went out by post in January thus specified separate voting for delegates of each Estate. Each tax district (cities, boroughs, and parishes) would elect their own delegates to the Third Estate. The Bailliages, or judicial districts, would elect delegates to the First and Second Estates in separate ballots. Each voting assembly would also collect a cahier de doléances (notebook of grievances) to be considered by the Convocation. The election rules differed somewhat depending on the type of voting unit, whether city, parish or some other. Generally, the distribution of delegates was by population: the most populous locations had the greatest number of delegates. The City of Paris was thus dominant. The electorate consisted of males 25 years and older, property owners, and registered taxpayers. They could be native or naturalized citizens.

The number of delegates elected was about 1,200, half of whom formed the Third Estate. The First and Second Estates had 300 each. But French society had changed since 1614, and these Estates-General were not identical to those of 1614. Members of the nobility were not required to stand for election to the Second Estate, and many of them were elected to the Third Estate. The total number of nobles in the three Estates was about 400. Noble representatives of the Third Estate were among the most passionate revolutionaries in attendance, including Jean Joseph Mounier and the comte de Mirabeau. Some clergy were also elected as Third Estate delegates, most notably the abbé Sieyès. Despite their status as elected representatives of the Third Estate, many of these nobles were executed by guillotine during the Terror.

The Nobles in the Second Estate were the richest and most powerful in the kingdom. The King could count on them, but that was of little use to him in the succeeding course of history. He had also expected that the First Estate would be predominantly the noble Bishops. The electorate, however, returned mainly parish priests, most of whom were sympathetic to the Commons. The Third Estate elections returned predominantly magistrates and lawyers. The lower levels of society, the landless, working men, though present in large numbers in street gangs, were totally absent from the Estates-General, as the King had called for "the most notable persons".

The grievances returned were mainly about taxes, which the people considered a crushing burden. Consequently, the people and the King were totally at odds from the very beginning. Aristocratic privilege was also attacked. The people resented the fact that nobles could excuse themselves from most of the burden of taxation and service that fell on the ordinary people. A third type complained that the ubiquitous tolls and duties levied by the nobility hindered internal commerce.

Opening of the Convention 
On 5 May 1789, amidst general festivities, the Estates-General convened in an elaborate but temporary Île des États set up in one of the courtyards of the official Hôtel des Menus Plaisirs in the town of Versailles near the royal château. With the étiquette of 1614 strictly enforced, the clergy and nobility ranged in tiered seating in their full regalia, while the physical locations of the deputies from the Third Estate were at the far end, as dictated by the protocol. When Louis XVI and Charles Louis François de Paule de Barentin, the Keeper of the Seals of France, addressed the deputies on 6 May, the Third Estate discovered that the royal decree granting double representation also upheld the traditional voting "by orders", i.e. that the collective vote of each estate would be weighed equally.

The apparent intent of the King and of Barentin was for everyone to get directly to the matter of taxes. The larger representation of the Third Estate would remain merely a symbol while giving them no extra power. Director-General of Finance Jacques Necker had more sympathy for the Third Estate, but on this occasion he spoke only about the fiscal situation, leaving it to Barentin to speak on how the Estates-General was to operate.

Trying to avoid the issue of representation and to focus solely on taxes, the King and his ministers had gravely misjudged the situation. The Third Estate wanted the estates to meet as one body and for each delegate to have one vote. The other two estates, while having their own grievances against royal absolutism, believed – correctly, as history was to prove – that they stood to lose more power to the Third Estate than they stood to gain from the King. Necker sympathized with the Third Estate in this matter, but the astute financier lacked equal astuteness as a politician. He decided to let the impasse play out to the point of stalemate before he would enter the fray. As a result, by the time the King yielded to the demand of the Third Estate, it seemed to all to be a concession wrung from the monarchy, rather than a magnanimous gift that would have convinced the populace of the King's goodwill.

Proceedings and dissolution

The Estates-General reached an impasse. The Second Estate pushed for meetings that were to transpire in three separate locations, as they had traditionally. The Comte de Mirabeau, a noble himself but elected to represent the Third Estate, tried but failed to keep all three orders in a single room for this discussion. Instead of discussing the King's taxes, the three estates began to discuss separately the organization of the legislature. These efforts continued without success until 27 May, when the nobles voted to stand firm for each estate to verify its members separately. The following day, the Abbé Sieyès (a senior member of the clergy, but, like Mirabeau, elected to represent the Third Estate) moved that the representatives of the Third Estate, who now called themselves the Communes ("Commons"), proceed with verification and invite the other two estates to take part, but not to wait for them.

On 13 June 1789, the Third Estate arrived at a resolution to examine and settle the powers of the three orders. They invited the clergy and nobles to work with them on this endeavour. On 17 June, with the failure of efforts to reconcile the three estates, the Communes completed their own process of verification and almost immediately voted a measure far more radical: they declared themselves redefined as the National Assembly, an assembly not of the estates, but of the people. They invited the other orders to join them but made it clear that they intended to conduct the nation's affairs with or without them. As their numbers exceeded the combined numbers of the other estates, they could dominate any combined assembly in which issues were decided based on majority or supermajority votes of its members, rather than the traditional arrangement giving equal decision-making power to each of the three Estates. The Third Estate baulked at this traditional arrangement because the clergy and nobility were more conservative than the commoners and could overrule the Third Estate on any matter 2–1. The Third Estate had initially demanded to be granted double weight, allowing them to match the power of the First and Second Estates, but those estates had refused to accept this proposal.

The King attempted to resist this reorganization of the Estates-General. On the advice of the courtiers of his privy council, he resolved to go in state to the Assembly, annul its decrees, command the separation of the orders, and dictate the reforms to be effected by the restored Estates-General. On 20 June, he ordered the hall where the National Assembly met to be closed. The Assembly then went in search of a building large enough to hold them, taking their deliberations to the nearby tennis court, where they proceeded to swear the 'Tennis Court Oath', agreeing not to disband until they had settled the constitution of France. Two days later, deprived of the use of the tennis court as well, the Assembly met in the Church of Saint Louis, where the majority of the representatives of the clergy joined them: efforts to restore the old order had served only to accelerate events.

In the séance royale of 23 June, the King announced a Charte octroyée, a constitution granted by royal favour, which affirmed, subject to the traditional limitations, the right of separate deliberation for the three orders, which constitutionally formed three chambers. This move too failed; soon, at the request of the King, those representatives of the nobility who still stood apart also joined the National Assembly. The Estates-General had ceased to exist, having become the National Assembly (after 9 July 1789, renamed the National Constituent Assembly).

References

Citations

Sources

Further reading

 Furet, Francois, and Mona Ozouf, eds.  A Critical Dictionary of the French Revolution (1989) pp. 45–53

External links

 

1789 events of the French Revolution
1789 in France
Political history of the Ancien Régime
France 1788